Jump Back: The Best of The Rolling Stones is the sixth official compilation album by The Rolling Stones. It was initially released worldwide, except in the US, in 1993. The American release came on 24 August 2004.

It was the first Rolling Stones compilation packaged in the compact disc era, and covered the band's career from 1971's Sticky Fingers to then-most recent studio album Steel Wheels in 1989. It was also the band's first release under their contract with Virgin Records, which had been signed in November 1993, while Voodoo Lounge was being recorded. The album reached No. 16 in the UK and became an enduring seller. Despite its very belated release in the US in 2004, it managed to peak at No. 30 and go platinum.

The album artwork was designed by Bill Smith with an inner sleeve collage designed by Len Peltier.

In 2009 it was remastered and reissued by Universal Music, with the album version of "Miss You" being included in place of the single version.

Track listing 
All songs by Mick Jagger and Keith Richards, except where noted.

Charts

Weekly charts

Year-end charts

Certifications

References 

1993 greatest hits albums
Albums produced by Chris Kimsey
Albums produced by Jimmy Miller
Albums produced by Steve Lillywhite
Albums produced by the Glimmer Twins
The Rolling Stones compilation albums
Virgin Records compilation albums